Hypsopygia glaucinalis is a moth of the family Pyralidae. It is sometimes placed in the genus Orthopygia either alone or with a few other species. Being the type species of Orthopygia, as soon as O. glaucinalis is placed in Ocrasa (as is done here) "Orthopygia" is abolished. To further complicate matters, Ocrasa is now mostly treated as a synonym or subgenus of Hypsopygia.

It is native to the European continent. The wingspan is 23–31 mm. The adults fly from June to October in the temperate parts of its range (such as Belgium and the Netherlands).
 
The caterpillars feed on decaying plants and dry leaves. They have been found in some fairly unusual locations, such as Buteo nests, straw and thatching, and discarded paper.

Footnotes

References
  (1942): Eigenartige Geschmacksrichtungen bei Kleinschmetterlingsraupen ["Strange tastes among micromoth caterpillars"]. Zeitschrift des Wiener Entomologen-Vereins 27: 105-109 [in German]. PDF fulltext
  (2005): Markku Savela's Lepidoptera and some other life forms – Orthopygia. Version of 2005-SEP-08. Retrieved 2010-APR-12.

External links
 
 waarneming.nl 
 Lepidoptera of Belgium

Pyralini
Moths described in 1758
Moths of Europe
Moths of Japan
Moths of Asia
Taxa named by Carl Linnaeus